The 1996 Ipswich Borough Council election was an election to the Ipswich Borough Council under the arrangement, whereby a third of the councillors were to stand for election, each time.

It took place as part of the 1996 United Kingdom local elections.  

There were 16 wards each returning one councillor plus three bye-elections, one each for Chantry, Stoke Park and Town Wards. The Labour Party retained control of the Council.

References

Ipswich Borough Council elections
Ipswich